Yevgeni Viktorovich Karev (born 19 April 1985) is a former Russian professional footballer.

Club career
He made his debut for FC Shinnik Yaroslavl on 3 July 2004 in an Intertoto Cup game against FK Teplice. He made two more appearances in that Intertoto Cup. He also appeared for Shinnik on 31 July 2004 in a Russian Cup game against FC SKA-Energiya Khabarovsk.

He played in the Russian Football National League for FC Spartak Chelyabinsk in 2005.

External links
 

1985 births
Living people
Russian footballers
Association football defenders
FC Khimki players
FC Shinnik Yaroslavl players
FC Chernomorets Novorossiysk players
FC Spartak-UGP Anapa players
FC Spartak Nizhny Novgorod players